Mali London (Serbian Cyrillic: Мали Лондон, English: Little London) is a suburban settlement in Pančevo, Serbia. Mali London is located on both sides of the road E70, nearby the industrial site of the city. It has about 70 housing units, inhabited by Romani people.

The first housings were built 50 years ago. Many of the residents of Mali London make a living by recycling metal. Used cars are brought to the settlement and taken apart, to be resold as scrap or sheet metal. The settlement is without running water or electricity, and it presents a health risk for its inhabitants. In 2005, some people of Mali London have formed the association Mali Rit London Društvo Roma.

References

See also
Little London - A full list of places with this name

Pančevo
Romani communities in Serbia